Home Grown African (sometimes HGA) is a Malawian hip hop duo based in Blantyre, Malawi. The group consists of artists Classick and Hayze Engolah. Known for songs including "T.I.A." and "Radio" they are one of Malawi's best-regarded rap acts.

The group performed at Lake of Stars Festival in 2014 and headlined the 4th UMP Music festival in November 2015. They also partnered with Coca-Cola for the 2015 Kuphaka Life College Campus Tour.

Home Grown African released Blantyre Blues EP in December 2015.

Discography
 Blantyre Blues EP (2015)

See also
Music of Malawi

References

External links

Living people
Malawian hip hop groups
Year of birth missing (living people)